Niton is a village on the Isle of Wight in England.

Niton may also refer to:

 Niton (element) (symbol "Nt"), alternate term for radon
 Niton, Alberta, Canada; a locality in Yellowhead County
 "Niton (The Reason)", a song by Eric Prydz

See also